Troll 3 may refer to:
The Crawlers (film), a 1993 Italian horror film also known as Troll 3
Quest for the Mighty Sword, a 1990 Italian fantasy film also known as Troll 3